West Stockholm Historic District is a national historic district located in the town of Stockholm in St. Lawrence County, New York.  The district includes 27 contributing buildings and three contributing sites.  The district encompasses the archaeological sites of mills and small factories as well as the cluster of extant residences, shops, and public buildings which comprises the village center.  The buildings were built between 1815 and about 1900.

It was listed on the National Register of Historic Places in 1979.

References

Historic districts on the National Register of Historic Places in New York (state)
Archaeological sites in New York (state)
Historic districts in St. Lawrence County, New York
National Register of Historic Places in St. Lawrence County, New York